Jesús Manuel 'Chus' Bravo Suárez (born 3 May 1979 in Gijón, Asturias) is a Spanish former footballer who played as a central defender.

References

External links

1979 births
Living people
Footballers from Gijón
Spanish footballers
Association football defenders
Segunda División players
Segunda División B players
Sporting de Gijón B players
UP Langreo footballers
Sporting de Gijón players
Mérida UD footballers
Cultural Leonesa footballers
Caudal Deportivo footballers